Halflings are a fictional race found in some fantasy novels and games. They are often depicted as similar to humans except about half as tall, and are not quite as stocky as the similarly-sized dwarves. Similar to the depiction of hobbits in the works of J. R. R. Tolkien, which are sometimes called halflings, they have slightly pointed ears, their feet are covered with curly hair with leathery soles, and they tend to be portrayed as stealthy and lucky.

Etymology 
Originally, halfling comes from the Scots word , meaning an awkward rustic teenager, who is neither man nor boy, and so half of both. Another word for halfling is hobbledehoy or hobby. This usage of the word pre-dates both The Hobbit and Dungeons & Dragons.

Usage in fantasy fiction
In The Lord of the Rings, J. R. R. Tolkien occasionally used the term "halfling" to describe hobbits, since they are beings that are half the height of men. For instance, when the hobbit Pippin Took appears in a royal guard's uniform in Minas Tirith, the people of that city call him the "Prince of Halflings". The term has since been used in other fiction works as an alternate name for hobbit-like peoples inspired by Tolkien's legendarium.

Halflings have long been one of the playable humanoid races in Dungeons & Dragons (D&D), starting with the 1978 Player's Handbook. Later editions of the original D&D box set began using the name halfling as an alternative to hobbit for legal reasons. An example of a noteworthy halfling character featured in a series of novels based on the Forgotten Realms, a D&D campaign setting, is Regis, a halfling rogue member of the Companions of the Hall led by Drizzt Do'Urden. While he behaves in the stereotypical manner of Tolkien's hobbits, Bricken from io9 noted that Regis "set himself apart a bit by carrying a crystal pendant he can use to charm people", though he also finds himself into dangerous situations and ends up saving the day in the final battle of The Crystal Shard (1988) in a manner not unlike Bilbo Baggins. Besides licensed D&D novels, halfling characters have appeared in various tabletop and video games.

Some fantasy stories use the term halfling to describe a person born of a human parent and a parent of another race, often a female human and a male elf. Terry Brooks describes characters such as Shea Ohmsford from his Shannara series as a halfling of elf–human parentage. In Jack Vance's Lyonesse series of novels, "halfling" is a generic term for beings such as fairies, trolls and ogres, who are composed of both magical and earthly substances. In Clifford D. Simak's 1959 short story "No Life of Their Own", halflings are invisible beings in a parallel dimension who, like brownies or gremlins, bring good or bad luck to people.

References

Fictional humanoids
Fictional human hybrids
Fictional human races